Andrea is the one and only album released by The Sunrays. The album was released in 1966 under Tower Records. The album included the band's three hits, "I Live for the Sun", "Andrea", and "Still".

Track listing

Side one
All lead vocals Rick Henn unless otherwise stated 
"Andrea" (Richard Henn) – 2:12
"A Little Dog and His Boy" (Richard Henn) – 2:44
"Have to Be Myself" (H. King) – 2:21
"I Look Baby-I Can't See" (Donald Rockwell) – 2:36
"You Don't Phase Me" (H. King) – 2:15
"Still" (Bill Anderson) – 2:30

Side two
"I Live for the Sun" (Richard Henn) – 2:27
"Jo Ann" (Eddy Medora) – 2:03 Lead Vocal: Eddy Medora
"Better Be Good to Me" (Holly Knight) – 3:05
"Bye Baby Bye" (Murry Wilson) – 2:07 Lead Vocal: Marty DiGiovanni
"Tears in My Eyes" (Eddy Medora) – 2:01 Lead Vocal: Eddy Medora
"Since My Findin' You" (H. King) – 2:27

References

1966 debut albums
The Sunrays albums
Tower Records albums
Albums produced by Murry Wilson
Albums recorded at Gold Star Studios